Ustad Ali Quli was a Ottoman Turkish commander of the Mughal Empire. Under the reign of Babur, he commanded the artillery for his army. At the Battle of Panipat and Battle of Khanwa, he commanded his cannon batteries. His role in these battles as commander of the artillery was a vital one, as it was the rifleman and cannons under Mustafa Rumi and Ustad Ali Quli that won the day.

Introduction of Ustad Ali Quli to Babur
Babur's early relations with the Ottomans were poor because the Ottoman Sultan Selim I provided Babur's rival Ubaydullah Khan with powerful matchlocks and cannons. In 1507, when ordered to accept Selim I as his rightful suzerain, Babur refused and gathered Qizilbash servicemen in order to counter the forces of Ubaydullah Khan during the Battle of Ghazdewan. In 1513, Selim I reconciled with Babur (fearing that he would join the Safavids), dispatched Ustad Ali Quli  and Mustafa Rumi the matchlock marksman, and many other Ottoman Turks, in order to assist Babur in his conquests; this particular assistance proved to be the basis of future Mughal-Ottoman relations. From them, he also adopted the tactic of using matchlocks and cannons in field (rather than only in sieges), which would give him an important advantage in India.

References

Mughal Empire people
Year of birth missing
Year of death missing
16th-century people from the Ottoman Empire